Nowe Krzewo  is a village in the administrative district of Gmina Zawady, within Białystok County, Podlaskie Voivodeship, in north-eastern Poland.

History
Nowe Krzewo, Stare Krzewo and Krzewo-Plebanki were recognized as separate villages already in the 15th century.

During World War II, the village was occupied by the Soviet Union from 1939 to 1941, and by Nazi Germany from 1941 to 1944.

References

Villages in Białystok County